is a former Japanese football player.

Playing career
Yokoyama was born in Kagoshima Prefecture on May 9, 1975. After graduating from Osaka University of Commerce, he joined J1 League club JEF United Ichihara in 1998. He played many matches from first season. In 2000, he moved to Japan Football League (JFL) club Yokohama FC. He played many matches and the club won the champions in 2000 and was promoted to J2 League from 2001. Although he could not play at all in the match in 2002, he became a regular player in 2003. However his opportunity to play decreased in 2004. In September 2004, he moved to J2 club Ventforet Kofu and played as regular player. However he could hardly play in the match in 2005. In 2006, he moved to Regional Leagues club TDK. He played many matches and the club was promoted to JFL from 2007. He retired end of 2007 season.

Coaching career
After retirement, Yokoyama started coaching career at TDK (later Blaublitz Akita) in 2008. In 2010, he became a manager and managed the club until end of 2011 season.

Club statistics

References

External links

1975 births
Living people
Osaka University of Commerce alumni
Association football people from Kagoshima Prefecture
Japanese footballers
J1 League players
J2 League players
Japan Football League players
JEF United Chiba players
Yokohama FC players
Ventforet Kofu players
Blaublitz Akita players
Japanese football managers
Blaublitz Akita managers
Association football midfielders